Süleyman Asaf İlbay (1882 – 1957) was a Turkish politician, mayor of Ankara and member of parliament.

References 

1882 births
1957 deaths
People from Thessaloniki
Place of death missing
20th-century Turkish politicians
Republican People's Party (Turkey) politicians